D25 may refer to:

Vehicles

Aircraft 
 Dewoitine D.25, a French fighter
 New Standard D-25, an American biplane

Ships 
 , an Allen M. Sumner-class destroyer of the Argentine Navy
 , a Gearing-class destroyer of the Brazilian Navy
 , a W-class destroyer of the Royal Navy
 , a Fletcher-class destroyer of the Spanish Navy

Rail transport 
 LNER Class D25, a class of British steam locomotive

Other uses 
 D-25 (rocket engine), a Soviet liquid rocket engine
 D-25 gun, a Soviet field gun
 D25 road (Croatia)
 DB-25, an electrical connector
 Soloviev D-25, a Soviet turboshaft helicopter engine
 Manitowish Waters Airport, in Vilas County, Wisconsin